Abraq may refer to the following places:

Abraq Khaytan, village in Kuwait
Al Abraq, Libya, town in Derna District
Al Abraq, Yemen, village in San‘a’ Governorate